Lawless Lawyer is a 2018 South Korean television series  ran  starring Lee Joon-gi, Seo Yea-ji, Lee Hye-young, and Choi Min-soo. The series was written by Yoon Hyun-ho and directed by Kim Jin-min. The series is set in the fictional city of Kisung which is described as lawless and corrupt.

The series follows characters Bong Sang-pil and Ha Jae-yi who form the Lawless Law Firm. Sang-pil, a former gangster turned lawyer, seeks to avenge his mother and fight against those with absolute power. He often resorts to using his fists and loopholes in the law to achieve his goals. Ha Jae-yi is a lawyer of high integrity who works with Sang-pil after she is suspended for assaulting a judge. Together they use the law to fight for justice against corrupt judge Cha Moon-sook and her associates.

Lawless Lawyer premiered on tvN on May 12, 2018. It concluded on July 1, 2018 with the airing of the 16th episode. The series was a commercial hit and became one of the highest-rated Korean dramas in cable television history.

Plot

Background
18 years prior to the events of the series, Cha Moon-sook murders a man critical of her late father. She then orders gangster Ahn Oh-joo to cover it up. Lawyer Cho Jin-ae discovers the truth of the event due to pictures taken by Noh Hyung-joo. Oh-joo murders Jin-ae but her young son Sang-pil escapes with the help of Hyung-joo. Sang-pil flees to his uncle Choi Dae-woong, who is a gangster in Seoul. Hyung-joo is forced to leave her husband and young daughter Ha Jae-yi behind to flee the country. Moon-sook becomes a prominent judge and is seen as a pillar of the community. Oh-joo becomes the boss of large corporation and gains wealth. Sang-pil and Jae-yi both become lawyers in the city of Seoul.

Synopsis
An adult Sang-pil leaves his lucrative practice in Seoul and returns to Kisung to bring those responsible for his mother's death to justice. He takes over a loan shark business and converts it into the Lawless Law Firm. Jae-yi is suspended from practicing law after assaulting a judge, loses her job, and also returns home to Kisung. She soon ends up working for Sang-pil, and later becomes his partner when reinstated as a lawyer. After learning the truth about Moon-sook, she joins Sang-pil in his pursuit of justice for the wrong done to their mothers. Together, they use the law to fight against Moon-sook and her associates. Over time, they fall in love.

Moon-sook and Oh-joo grow in influence and power through corrupt methods; Oh-joo becomes the mayor of Kisung and Moon-sook is nominated for chief justice in the Supreme Court. They and their associates oppose the Lawless Law Firm both inside and outside the courtroom by using underhanded tactics, including murdering Dae-woong and framing Sang-pil for it, bribing or threatening witnesses and assaulting Jae-yi. Despite the obstacles in their way, Sang-pil and Jae-yi succeed in revealing Moon-sook's crimes in court and successfully plead their case against her. Moon-sook and her associates end up in prison, whereas Oh-joo commits suicide. Jae-yi and Sang-pil then return to Seoul to help Prosecutor Cheon Seung-beom fight against corrupt officials.

Cast

Main
 Lee Joon-gi as Bong Sang-pil – a former gangster turned lawyer who takes advantage of loopholes in the law and boasts an excellent win rate. Born in Kisung, but raised by his uncle Dae-woong in Seoul after his mother was killed. As a member of his uncle's gang, he became an excellent fighter. Prior to becoming a lawyer, he spent time in prison for his gang activity, he has lived a life of hardship. While now a lawyer, he is not afraid to use his fists and his old gang connections when needed for a case. He is defined by his desire to gain justice for his mother and his loyalty to Jae-yi. He trusts Jae-yi completely, even when his life, freedom, or work is on the line.
 Lee Ro-woon as young Bong Sang-pil
 Seo Yea-ji as Ha Jae-yi – a lawyer of integrity who ends up being temporarily disbarred after verbally attacking a corrupt judge in court. Raised by her father after the disappearance of her mother, she returns to Kisung jobless and in disgrace but chances upon Sang-pil, who offers her an opportunity to regain her license. Before her return to Kisung, she thought highly of Moon-sook as a role model. Having learned the truth, however, she is relentless in seeking justice for her mother and Sang-pil. Described by actress Seo Yea-ji as unable to hold in her anger, she does not back down when she is in the right. As a strong, independent woman, she is an equal partner with Sang-pil and protects those she loves. She is loyal to Sang-pil even when others, such as her father, oppose her relationship with him.
 Lee Hye-young as Cha Moon-sook – a senior judge who is highly respected but corrupt and greedy. She appears noble, caring, and just and will go through great lengths to protect that reputation. She has ordered murders, rigged trials, run a corrupt charity for her own gain, and chosen city leaders favorable to her cause. The antagonist of the series, she manipulates others with ease. She is a formidable opponent to any who cross her and shows no remorse for her past actions. She was sentenced to life imprisonment for her crimes nearing the end of the series.
 Choi Min-soo as Ahn Oh-joo – a former gangster, he has also been the boss of a large corporation and the mayor of Kisung. He is a dangerous, unscrupulous man who tries to hide his ugly past and true colors. While he wishes to distance himself from his old associates, he still uses them to protect his goals. Once a loyal fixer for Moon-sook's father, he came to support her as well. He is charismatic and can easily convince others to do his bidding. Defined by his ambition and love for money, he will do anything to gain a higher position in life. Oh-joo committed suicide at the end of the series before he can be arrested for his crimes.

Supporting

Lawless Law Firm
 Kim Byung-hee as Tae Kwang-soo – a former gangster who manages the field team at the law firm. His life was saved by Sang-pil, who then went to prison for doing so. Since then, he is fiercely loyal to Sang-pil, and does not hesitate to do whatever he is asked to do. As a former gangster, he has some fighting skills, but also good skill with technology. He is determined to study law and become a lawyer himself.
 Lim Ki-hong as Keum Kang – former manager of the loan shark company that became the Lawless Law Firm. He continues to work at the firm and often takes the lead in field activities. While not as skilled as others in the firm, he gives his full effort to his tasks. He once decided to study law but gave it up after struggling to understand the law books.
 Seo Ye-hwa as Keum Ja – sister of Keum Kang, she is hired at the law firm after demonstrating her efficiency. She is good with numbers, and can determine the value of something quickly. Often she is the key to the success of the field team. Not afraid to speak her mind and share her feelings, she is also not easily embarrassed. She is attracted to lawyers and has the desire to marry one someday.

People around Cha Moon-sook
 Yeom Hye-ran as Nam Soon-ja – assistant to Moon-sook. While not officially holding a job, she is known as the person to go through to get to Moon-sook. Willing to do anything that is asked, she often communicates the orders for dirty deeds. She is constantly suspicious of Oh-joo and does not understand why Moon-sook favors him. Her foremost desire is for her daughter to have a good life.
 Cha Jung-won as Kang Yeon-hee – a prosecutor and daughter of Soon-ja. She has been rivals with Jae-yi since their days in law school. While an intelligent and passionate woman, she allows her pride to get the best of her. After being embarrassed while losing a case to Sang-pil, she joined Moon-sook's side. Her desire is to continue advancing her career and to have the respect of others. 
 Jeon Jin-gi as Ko In-doo – a former judge turned top lawyer at Oh-joo's company. Seen as a high-powered lawyer, many consider it an honor to be defended by him in court. At Moon-sook's orders, however, he often sabotages the cases to make it hard for his clients to win. He is motivated by the money and power such corrupt actions bring him.

People around Ahn Oh-joo
 Choi Dae-hoon as Suk Kwan-dong – campaign manager and assistant to Oh-joo. From Kisung, he went to Seoul to start his own gang, but was forced to return. He is not afraid to resort to force and even murder to get his way. Since being given a second chance by Oh-joo after his return, he has carried out his orders. His first loyalty, however, is to money and any method by which he can acquire it.
 Lee Dae-yeon as Woo Hyung-man – a police detective under Oh-joo's influence. At one time, he was an honorable police officer. However, he is corrupt in order to get money to pay his wife's medical bills. Once ordered to kill Sang-pil and Hyung-joo, he has allowed Oh-joo to think he has done so. Defined by his love for his wife, he has allowed it to overcome his sense of right and wrong.

People around Bong Sang-pil
 Shin Eun-jung as Choi Jin-ae – a lawyer and the mother of Sang-pil. A single parent, she raised her son while running her own law firm. She is known for her commitment to her clients and looks out for them even when they do not request help. While a friend of Moon-sook, she is willing to reveal Moon-sook's crimes due to her integrity. She did not approve of her brother's activity as a gangster and, at the time of her death, was not on speaking terms with him.
 Ahn Nae-sang as Choi Dae-woong – a leading gangster in Seoul and uncle of Sang-pil. He raised Sang-pil as his own child following the death of his sister Jin-ae, and supported his schooling as a lawyer despite only discovering Sang-pil's existence after Jin-ae's death. Jin-ae had not been on speaking terms with him due to their differing lifestyles. Despite being the leader of a gang, he has a strong sense of honor and does not believe in murder. Even though he desires justice for his sister, he repeatedly warns Sang-pil that revenge is not the answer. He cares deeply for his nephew and those close to him, and puts their safety above money, the gang, and his own life.
 Park Ho-san as Cheon Seung-beom – a determined public prosecutor who helps Sang-pil and Jae-yi. Sang-pil highly respects him as he had crossed paths with the prosecutor during his time in a gang (Seung-beom was the prosecutor who sent him to jail). Not swayed by power, money, or pressure, he cares more about the case and getting justice rather than promotion. Seung-beom does what he thinks is best regardless of what his superiors tell him to do. He is defined by his sense of justice and desire to unravel corruption at all costs.
 Park Min-jung as Yoo Kyung-jin

People around Ha Jae-yi
 Lee Han-wi as Ha Ki-ho – photo studio owner, father of Jae-yi, and husband of Hyung-joo. Having raised Jae-yi as a single parent since her mother's sudden disappearance, he has gone through hardship to support her. Due to the costs of her law degree, he owes loan sharks a good amount of money. An ardent supporter of Moon-sook, he does not approve of any who criticize her. He initially opposes the relationship between Jae-yi and Sang-pil due to the latter's delinquent past.
 Baek Joo-hee as Noh Hyun-joo – photographer, massage therapist, and mother of Jae-yi. Due to her evidence of Moon-sook's crimes, Oh-joo ordered Woo Hyung-man to kill her but the latter spared her life instead. While assumed dead, she actually survived by hiding in Thailand. Having returned to Kisung, she desires to bring Moon-sook down so Jae-yi will not get hurt. Even though she saved Sang-pil's life when he was younger, she initially disapproves of his relationship with Jae-yi.
 Kim Kwang-kyu as Kong Jang-Soo - police officer formerly the lead detective in charge of the Choi Jin-ae and Noh Hyung-joo cases back in the day. He later meets their now-adult children and agrees to help them piece together the evidence in order to bring Cha Moon-sook's crimes to light.

Others

 Jung Young-hoon
 Lee Bok-gi
 Baek Joo-hee as Noh Hyun-joo	
 Kim Ki-hyun
 Jang Yool as a detective (ep. 4-5)
 Kim Dong-gyu
 Kim Chang-hee
 Yoon Joon-ho
 Kim Min-geon
 Park Shin-woon
 Park Sung-gyun
 Son Min-ji
 Jeon Bae-soo
 Lee Ho-cheol

Special appearances
 Jin Seon-kyu as Motorcycle Officer Park (Ep. 1)
 Jeon Gook-hwan

Episodes

Production
In early 2018, Namoo Actors revealed that Lee Joon-gi was in talks to play a lawyer in an upcoming drama. However, details of the drama and its release date remained unknown. Then in February, Lee Joon-gi confirmed that he had been cast as the male lead. It would be his first production with director Kim Jin-min since Time Between Dog and Wolf in 2007. Soon after, Seo Yea-ji was confirmed as the female lead opposite Lee Joon-gi.

The first script reading took place on February 28, 2018 at Studio Dragon in Sangam-dong, Seoul, South Korea. The results of the script reading reportedly helped Studio Dragon to build confidence in the drama.

Original soundtrack

Part 1

Part 2

Part 3

Part 4

Viewership

Awards and nominations

For her portrayal of an honest lawyer, Seo Yea-ji was named as an honorary police officer.

International broadcast
 The series aired in the U.S., Taiwan, Malaysia, Singapore, Indonesia, the Philippines, and Thailand at the same time as its Korean broadcast. Later, it aired in Japan in August on Mnet Japan.
 In Malaysia, the series was broadcast on 8TV every Wednesday and Thursday at 10:30pm to 11:30pm from May 16 to August 1, 2018.
 In the Philippines, the series will be aired on UNTV on 2022.

Potential Trigger Warnings
Murder, Death of a loved one, Physical abuse, Physical violence, Verbal abuse

References

External links
  

 Lawless Lawyer at Studio Dragon 
 Lawless Lawyer at Logos Film 
 

TVN (South Korean TV channel) television dramas
2018 South Korean television series debuts
South Korean legal television series
South Korean thriller television series
Television series by Studio Dragon
Television series by Logos Film
2018 South Korean television series endings
Legal thrillers